Ultra Hand is a toy that was manufactured by Nintendo in the late 1960s. It was created in 1966 by Gunpei Yokoi, who would later design the Love Tester, the D-pad, the Game Boy, and the WonderSwan.

Ultra Hand consists of several criss-cross-connected plastic elements, and operates on the "lazy tongs" pantograph principle. One end of the Ultra Hand has scissor-like handles and is operated like scissors, extending when the handles are pinched together and retracting when they are parted.  On the other end of the Ultra Hand are two bowl-shaped grips with which ball-like objects can be gripped when the Ultra Hand is fully extended. Three colored balls were included in the Ultra Hand package, along with stands on which the balls can rest.

Ultra Hand was a commercial success, selling more than one million units. It is the first of several toys developed by Yokoi that helped to save the company from serious financial difficulties.

In media 
Ultra Hand appears in various WarioWare titles, as well as Wario: Master of Disguise. In Mario Power Tennis, Wario is seen using the Ultra Hand for one of his power shots. It appears as a furniture item in Animal Crossing: New Leaf. Ultra Hand is seen underneath Mario Kart: Super Circuit's Mario Circuit's hairpin turn, suspending the track in Mario Kart 8, and as a decoration behind the counter in the Bomb Shop in The Legend of Zelda: Majora's Mask 3D.

A WiiWare game titled Grill-Off with Ultra Hand! was released in North America on March 31, 2010 exclusive to Club Nintendo members.  The game features the Ultra Hand stretching out to grab cooked meats from barbecue grills. In single-player mode, the goal is to last as long as possible. In two-player mode, they compete for the most points in 90 seconds.

An Ultra Hand is also featured in Splatoon 3. The fill-in shop-keeper of Hotlantis, Harmony, can be seen fiddling with one upon entering the shop.

See also 
Love Tester
Ultra Machine
List of Nintendo products

References 

1960s toys
Nintendo toys
WiiWare games